The kids' meal or children's meal is a fast food combination meal tailored to and marketed to children. Most kids' meals come in colorful bags or cardboard boxes with depictions of activities/games on the bag or box and a toy inside. Most standard kids' meals comprise a burger or chicken nuggets, a side item, and a soft drink.

History
The first kids' meal, Funmeal, emerged at Burger Chef in 1973 and succeeded. Discerning the popularity of the kids' meal, McDonald's introduced its Happy Meal in 1978, and other fast food corporations, including Burger King, followed suit with their own kids' meals.

Some fast food corporations considered children their "most important" customers, owing to the success of the kids' meals. Their effectiveness has been ascribed to the fact that the patronage of youngsters often means the patronage of a family and to the allure of the toys, which often are in collectible series. In 2006, $360 million of the expenditures of fast food corporations was for toys in kids' meals, which numbered over 1.2 billion.

In recent years, the popularity of the kids' meal has receded, with a study by NPD Group indicating that there was a 6% decrease in kids' meal sales in 2011. Explanations include parents' realization that kids' meals are unhealthy, parents' desire to save money (opting instead to order from the value menu), as well as kids' outgrowing the meals earlier than before. Youngsters have "become more sophisticated in their palates" and seek items from the regular menu but in smaller servings. Kids' meal toys are also no longer appealing to the increasingly technology-oriented youth, who prefer video games.

Kids' meals have evolved in response to critics, offering healthier selections and greater variety. In 2011, nineteen food chains participating in the Kids Live Well initiative—including Burger King, Denny's, IHOP, Chili's, Friendly's, Chevy's, and El Pollo Loco—pledged to "offer at least one children's meal that has fewer than 600 calories, no soft drinks and at least two items from the following food groups: fruits, vegetables, whole grains, lean proteins or low-fat dairy".

Criticism
There have been concerns from food critics about the nutritional value of the kids' meal. A 2010 study by the Rudd Center for Food Policy and Obesity inspecting the kids' meals of twelve US food chains concluded that of 3,039 entrée combinations, twelve satisfied the advised levels of fat, sodium, and calories for preschool kids and fifteen those for older kids.

Toys being inappropriate for the target audience's age group
Burger King has received controversy for promoting and aiming at children several PG-13 rated films, including 1998's Small Soldiers, 2005's Star Wars: Episode III – Revenge of the Sith, and 2007's The Simpsons Movie. McDonald's similarly received criticism for releasing Happy Meal toys for the film Batman Returns, eventually recalling and stopping the promotion of the toys following complaints from parents that Batman Returns was unsuitable for children. When McDonald's promoted 2015's Minions there was controversy because parents thought one of the toys used profanity.

Legislation
In the United States, kids' meals have been blamed for ingraining unhealthy dietary habits in youngsters and augmenting child obesity. In 2010, Santa Clara County, California implemented a ban on toys accompanying kids' meals that fail nutritional standards; affected restaurants showed a 2.8- to 3.4-fold improvement in Children's Menu Assessment scores from pre- to post-ordinance (e.g., improvements in on-site nutritional guidance; promotion of healthy meals, beverages, and side items; and toy marketing and distribution activities) with minimal changes at unaffected restaurants. San Francisco County enacted the same ban, and similar ones have been proposed or considered in other cities or states across the country. Research that examined the impact of the San Francisco ban indicated that both affected restaurant chains responded to the ordinance by selling toys separately from children's meals, but neither changed their menus to meet ordinance-specified nutrition criteria. Conversely, legislators in Arizona prohibited such restrictions, and Florida state senators proposed the same.

Outside the United States, Spain and Brazil have also considered such measures. Chile has banned toys in kids' meals altogether.

See also

 List of restaurant terminology

Notes

References

Childhood
Fast food
Restaurant terminology
Food for children